The London Working Men's Association was an organisation established in London in 1836. It was one of the foundations of Chartism, advocating for universal male suffrage, equally-populated electoral districts, the abolition of property qualifications for MPs, annual Parliaments, the payment of MPs, and the establishment of secret ballot voting. The founders were William Lovett, Francis Place and Henry Hetherington. They appealed to skilled workers rather than the mass of unskilled factory labourers. They were associated with Owenite socialism and the movement for general education.

References

External links
Image of the Minute Book of the LWMA for 18 October 1836 at the British Library.
 The Address of the London Working Men's Association to the People of Canada, 1837
 The Six Points and the London Working Men's Association, on Chartist Ancestors
Feargus O'Connor & The Chartists – UK Parliament Living Heritage

Chartism
Labour in the United Kingdom
Labor history
19th century in London
Political organisations based in London
History of socialism
Socialist parties in England
1836 establishments in England
Working class in England
1836 in London
Owenism